Lasanius is a genus of basal anaspida from the Early Silurian. Its fossils are around 10 mm  to 150 mm in length.

Fossils have been found in Early Silurian-aged strata in Ayrshire, Muirkirk, Scotland and Seggholm.

References 
R.H. Traquair M.D. LL.D. F.R.S. (1898) IX.—Notes on Palœozoic fishes.—No. II, Annals and Magazine of Natural History, 2:7, 67–70, DOI: 10.1080/00222939808678013

Traquair, R. (1899). XXXII.—Report on Fossil Fishes collected by the Geological Survey of Scotland in the Silurian Rocks of the South of Scotland. Transactions of the Royal Society of Edinburgh, 39(3), 827–864. doi:10.1017/S0080456800035237

External links 
 Underwhelming Fossil Fish of the Month: February 2016
Lasanius fossils

Silurian jawless fish
Extinct animals of Europe
Fossil taxa described in 1898
Birkeniiformes genera